Bertram Allen may refer to:

 Bertram Allen (admiral) (1875–1957), British Royal Navy officer
 Bertram Allen (equestrian) (born 1995), Irish showjumper